The Visigothic Kingdom, Visigothic Spain or Kingdom of the Goths, was a kingdom that occupied what is now southwestern France and the Iberian Peninsula from the 5th to the 8th centuries. One of the Germanic successor states to the Western Roman Empire, it was originally created by the settlement of the Visigoths under King Wallia in the province of Gallia Aquitania in southwest Gaul by the Roman government and then extended by conquest over all of Hispania. The Kingdom maintained independence from the Eastern Roman or Byzantine Empire, whose attempts to re-establish Roman authority in Hispania were only partially successful and short-lived.

The Visigoths were romanized central Europeans who had moved west from the Danube Valley. They became foederati of Rome, and wanted to restore the Roman order against the hordes of Vandals, Alans and Suebi. The Western Roman Empire fell in 476 AD; therefore, the Visigoths believed they had the right to take the territories that Rome had promised in Hispania in exchange for restoring the Roman order. Under King Euric—who eliminated the status of foederati—a triumphal advance of the Visigoths began. Alarmed at Visigoth expansion from Aquitania after victory over the Gallo-Roman and Breton armies at Déols in 469, Western Emperor Anthemius sent a fresh army across the Alps against Euric, who was besieging Arles. The Roman army was crushed in the Battle of Arles nearby and Euric then captured Arles and secured much of southern Gaul. 

Sometimes referred to as the Regnum Tolosae or Kingdom of Toulouse after its capital Toulouse in modern historiography, the kingdom lost much of its territory in Gaul to the Franks in the early 6th century, save the narrow coastal strip of Septimania.  The kingdom of the 6th and 7th centuries is sometimes called the Regnum Toletanum or Kingdom of Toledo after the new capital of Toledo in Hispania.  A civil war starting in 549 resulted in an invitation from the Visigoth Athanagild, who had usurped the kingship, to the Byzantine  emperor Justinian I to send soldiers to his assistance.  Athanagild won his war, but the Byzantines took over Cartagena and a good deal of southern Hispania, until 624 when Swinthila expelled the last Byzantine garrisons from the peninsula, occupying Orcelis, which the Visigoths called Aurariola (today Orihuela in the Province of Alicante).  Starting in the 570s Athanagild's brother Liuvigild compensated for this loss by conquering the Kingdom of the Suebi in Gallaecia (corresponding roughly to present-day Galicia and the northern part of Portugal) and annexing it, and by repeated campaigns against the Basques. 

The ethnic distinction between the  Hispano-Roman population and the Visigoths had largely disappeared by this time (the Gothic language lost its last and probably already declining function as a church language when the Visigoths renounced Arianism in 589). This newfound unity found expression in increasingly severe persecution of outsiders, especially the Jews. The Visigothic Code, completed in 654, abolished the old tradition of having different laws for Hispano-Romans and for Visigoths. The 7th century saw many civil wars between factions of the aristocracy. Despite good records left by contemporary bishops, such as Isidore and Leander of Seville, it becomes increasingly difficult to distinguish Goths from Hispano-Romans, as the two became inextricably intertwined. Despite these civil wars, by 625 AD the Visigoths had succeeded in expelling the Byzantines from Hispania and had established a foothold at the port of Ceuta in Africa. Most of the Visigothic Kingdom was conquered by Umayyad troops from North Africa in 711 AD, with only the northern reaches of Hispania remaining in Christian hands. These gave birth to the medieval Kingdom of Asturias when a  Visigothic nobleman called Pelagius was elected princeps by the Astures, of Celtic origin, who lived in the mountains, and by the Visigothic population, who had fled from the Muslims and took refuge in Asturias, where they joined Pelagius.

The Visigoths and their early kings were Arians and came into conflict with the Catholic Church, but after they converted to Nicene Christianity, the Church exerted an enormous influence on secular affairs through the Councils of Toledo. The Visigoths also developed the highly influential legal code known in Western Europe as the Visigothic Code, which would become the basis for Spanish law throughout the Middle Ages.

History

Federate Kingdom
From 407 to 409 AD, an alliance of Germanic Vandals, Iranian Alans and Germanic Suebi crossed the frozen Rhine and swept across modern France and into the Iberian peninsula. For their part, the Visigoths under Alaric famously sacked Rome in 410, capturing Galla Placidia, the sister of Western Roman emperor Honorius.

Athaulf (King of the Visigoths from 410 to 415) spent the next few years operating in the Gallic and Hispanic countrysides, diplomatically playing competing factions of Germanic and Roman commanders against one another to skillful effect, and taking over cities such as Narbonne and Toulouse (in 413). After he married Placidia, the Emperor Honorius enlisted him to provide Visigothic assistance in regaining nominal Roman control of Hispania from the Vandals, Alans and Suebi.

In 418, Honorius rewarded his Visigothic federates under King Wallia (reigned 415–418) by giving them land in the Garonne valley of Gallia Aquitania on which to settle. This probably took place under the system of hospitalitas. It seems likely that at first the Visigoths were not given a large amount of land estates in the region (as previously believed), but that they acquired the taxes of the region, with the local Gallic aristocrats now paying their taxes to the Visigoths instead of to the Roman government.

The Visigoths with their capital at Toulouse, remained de facto independent, and soon began expanding into Roman territory at the expense of the feeble Western empire. Under Theodoric I (418–451), the Visigoths attacked Arles (in 425 and 430) and Narbonne (in 436), but were checked by Litorius using Hunnic mercenaries. This resulted at first in Theodoric's defeat at the Battle of Narbonne in 436, but then in 439 at the Battle of Toulouse the Visigoths defeated the allied forces of Romans and Huns. By 451, the situation had reversed and the Huns had invaded Gaul; now Theodoric fought under Flavius Aetius against Attila the Hun in the Battle of the Catalaunian Plains. Attila was driven back, but Theodoric was killed in the battle.

The Vandals completed the conquest of North Africa when they took Carthage on October 19, 439 and the Suebi had taken most of Hispania. The Roman emperor Avitus now sent the Visigoths into Hispania. Theodoric II (453–466) invaded and defeated the King of the Suebi, Rechiarius, at the battle on the river Órbigo in 456 near Asturica Augusta (Astorga) and then sacked Bracara Augusta (Braga), the Suebi capital. The Goths sacked the cities in Gallaecia, part of the Suebi Kingdom quite brutally: they massacred a portion of the population and even attacked some holy places, probably due to the clergy's support of the Suebi. Theodoric took control over Hispania Baetica, Carthaginiensis and southern Lusitania. In 461, the Goths received the city of Narbonne from the emperor Libius Severus in exchange for their support. This led to a revolt by the army and by Gallo-Romans under Aegidius; as a result, Romans under Severus and the Visigoths fought other Roman troops, and the revolt ended only in 465.

Kingdom of Toulouse

In 466, Euric, who was the youngest son of Theodoric I, came to the Visigothic throne. He is infamous for murdering his elder brother Theodoric II who had himself become king by murdering his elder brother Thorismund.  Under Euric (466–484), the Visigoths began expanding in Gaul and consolidating their presence in the Iberian peninsula. Euric fought a series of wars with the Suebi who retained some influence in Lusitania, and brought most of this region under Visigothic power, taking Emerita Augusta (Mérida) in 469. Euric also attacked the Western Roman Empire, capturing Hispania Tarraconensis in 472, the last bastion of (Western)Roman rule in Spain. By 476, he had extended his rule to the Rhone and the Loire rivers which comprised most of southern Gaul. He also occupied the key Roman cities of Arles and Marseilles. In his campaigns, Euric had counted on a portion of the Gallo-Roman and Hispano-Roman aristocracy who served under him as generals and governors. The Visigothic Kingdom was formally recognized as an independent kingdom in former Roman territory instead of having the status of foederati when the Western emperor Julius Nepos (474–475) signed in 475 an alliance with Euric, granting him the lands south of the Loire and west of the Rhone in exchange for military service and the lands in Provence (including Arles and Marseilles). The lands in Hispania remained under de facto Visigothic control. After Odoacer deposed the last Roman emperor in the West, Romulus Augustulus, Euric quickly recaptured Provence, a fact which Odoacer formally accepted in a treaty.

By 500, the Visigothic Kingdom, centered at Toulouse, controlled Gallia Aquitania and Gallia Narbonensis and most of Hispania with the exception of the Suebic Kingdom of Galicia in the northwest and small areas controlled by independent Iberian peoples, such as the Basques and the Cantabrians. Euric's son Alaric II (484–507) issued a new body of laws, the Breviarium Alarici and held a church council at Agde.

The Visigoths now came into conflict with the Franks under their King Clovis I, who had conquered northern Gaul. Following a brief war with the Franks, Alaric was forced to put down a rebellion in Tarraconensis, probably caused by recent Visigoth immigration to Hispania due to pressure from the Franks. In 507, the Franks attacked again, this time allied with the Burgundians. Alaric II was killed at the Battle of Campus Vogladensis (Vouillé) near Poitiers, and Toulouse was sacked. By 508, the Visigoths had lost most of their Gallic holdings save Septimania in the south.

Arian Kingdom of Hispania
After Alaric II's death, his illegitimate son Gesalec took power until he was deposed by Theodoric the Great, ruler of the Ostrogothic Kingdom, who invaded and defeated him at Barcelona. Gesalec fled and regrouped, but was defeated again at Barcelona, and was captured and killed. Theodoric then installed his grandson Amalaric (511–531), the son of Alaric II, as king. Amalaric, however, was still a child and power in Spain remained under the Ostrogothic general and regent, Theudis. Only after Theodoric's death (526) did Amalaric obtain control of his kingdom. His rule did not last long, as in 531, Amalaric was defeated by the Frankish king Childebert I and then murdered at Barcelona.Afterwards, Theudis (531–548) became king. He expanded Visigothic control over the southern regions, but he was also murdered after a failed invasion of Africa. Visigothic Spain suffered a civil war under King Agila I (549–554), which prompted the Roman/Byzantine emperor Justinian I to send an army and carve out the small province of Spania for the Byzantine Empire along the coast of southern Spain. Agila was eventually killed, and his enemy Athanagild (552–568) became the new king. He attacked the Byzantines, but he was unable to dislodge them from southern Spain, and was obliged to formally acknowledge the suzerainty of the Empire.

The next Visigothic king was Liuvigild (569 – April 21, 586). He was an effective military leader and consolidated Visigothic power in Spain. Liuvigild campaigned against the Eastern Romans in the south in the 570s and he took back Cordova after another revolt. He also fought in the north against the Galician Kingdom of the Suebi and various small independent states, including the Basques and the Cantabrians. He pacified northern Spain, but was unable to completely conquer these peoples. When Liuvigild established his son Hermenegild as joint ruler, a civil war ensued between them. Hermenegild became the first Visigothic king to convert to Nicene Christianity due to his ties with the Romans, but he was defeated in 584 and killed in 585. By the end of his reign, Liuvigild had united the entire Iberian peninsula, including the Suebic Kingdom which he conquered in 585 during a Suebi civil war that ensued after the death of King Miro. Liuvigild established amicable terms with the Franks through royal marriages, and they remained at peace throughout most of his reign. Liuvigild also founded new cities, such as Reccopolis and Victoriacum (Vitoria), the first barbarian king to do so.

Catholic Kingdom of Toledo

On becoming King, Liuvigild's son Reccared I (586–601) converted from Arian  to Chalcedonian Christianity. This led to some unrest in the kingdom, notably a revolt by the Arian  bishop of Mérida which was put down; he also beat back another Frankish offensive in the north. Reccared then oversaw the Third Council of Toledo in 589, where he announced his faith in the Nicene creed and denounced Arian. He adopted the name Flavius, the family name of the Constantinian dynasty, and styled himself as the successor to the Roman emperors. Reccared also fought the Byzantines in Hispania Baetica after they had begun a new offensive.

Reccared's son Liuva II became king in 601, but was deposed by the Visigothic noble Witteric (603–610), ending the short-lived dynasty. There were various Visigothic Kings between 610 and 631, and this period saw constant regicide. This period also saw the definitive conquest of the Byzantine territories in the south. War continued in the north against the Basques and Asturians, as indeed it would continue for the rest of the Visigothic Kingdom's existence. These Kings also worked on religious legislature, especially King Sisebut (612–621), who passed several harsh laws against Jews and forced many Jews to convert to Christianity. Sisebut was also successful against the Byzantines, taking several of their cities, including Málaga. The Byzantines were finally defeated by  Swinthila (621–631), who had captured all of their Spanish holdings by 625. Suinthila was deposed by the Franks and replaced by Sisinand.

The instability of this period can be attributed to the power struggle between the kings and the nobility. Religious unification strengthened the political power of the church, which it exercised through church councils at Toledo along with the nobles. The fourth council, held during the brief reign of Sisinand in 633, excommunicated and exiled the king, replacing him with Chintila (636–639). The church councils were now the most powerful institution in the Visigothic state; they took the role of regulating the process of succession to the kingship by election of the king by Gothic noble 'senators' and the church officials. They also decided to meet on a regular basis to discuss ecclesiastical and political matters affecting the Church. Finally, they decided the kings should die in peace, and declared their persons sacred, seeking to end the violence and regicides of the past. Despite all this, another coup took place and Chintila was deposed in 639, and King Tulga took his place; he was also deposed in the third year of his reign and the council elected the noble  Chindaswinth as king.

The reigns of  Chindaswinth and his son Recceswinth saw the compilation of the most important Visigothic law book, the Liber Iudiciorum (Catalan: Llibre Jutge, Spanish: Fuero Juzgo, English: Book of Judgements), also called Lex Visigothorum or the Visigothic Code promulgated by king  Chindaswinth  (642–653 AD), and completed in 654 by his son, king Recceswinth (649–672), abolished the old tradition of having different laws for Hispano-Romans and Visigoths. The new laws applied to both Gothic and Hispano-Roman populations who had been under different laws in the past, and it replaced all older codes of law. The code included old laws by past kings, such as  Alaric II in his Breviarium Alarici, and Leovigild, but many were also new laws. The code was based almost wholly on Roman law, with some influence of Germanic law in rare cases. Among the eliminated old laws were the harsh laws against Jews. The Liber showed the old system of military and civil divisions in administration was changing, and dukes (duces provinciae) and counts (comites civitatis) had begun taking more responsibilities outside their original military and civil duties. The servants or slaves of the king became very prominent in the bureaucracy and exercised wide administrative powers. With the Visigoth law codes, women could inherit land and title and manage it independently from their husbands or male relations, dispose of their property in legal wills if they had no heirs, and could represent themselves and bear witness in court by age 14 and arrange for their own marriages by age 20.  Chindaswinth (642–653) strengthened the monarchy at the expense of the nobility, he executed some 700 nobles, forced dignitaries to swear oaths, and in the seventh council of Toledo laid down his right to excommunicate clergy who acted against the government. He was also able to maneuver his son Recceswinth on the throne, sparking a rebellion by a gothic noble who allied with the Basques, but was put down. Recceswinth (653–672) held another council of Toledo, which reduced sentences for treason and affirmed the power of the councils to elect kings.

Following Recceswinth, King Wamba (672–680) was elected king. He had to deal with Flavius Paulus revolts in Tarraconensis and Hilderic of Nimes, and because of this, he felt a need to reform the army. He passed a law declaring all dukes, counts and other military leaders, as well as bishops, had to come to the aid of the kingdom once danger became known or risk harsh punishment. Wamba was eventually deposed in a bloodless coup. King Ervig (680–687) held further church councils and repealed the previous harsh laws of Wamba, though he still made provisions for the army. Ervig had his son-in-law Egica made king. Despite a rebellion by the bishop of Toledo, the 16th council, held in 693, denounced the bishop's revolt. The 17th council in 694 passed harsh laws against the Jews, citing a conspiracy, and many were enslaved, especially those who had converted from Christianity. Egica also raised his son Wittiza as coruler in 698. Not much is known about his reign, but a period of civil war quickly ensued between his sons (Achila  and Ardo) and King Roderic, who had seized Toledo.

Muslim conquest

In 711, Tariq ibn Ziyad, a Muslim Berber client of Musa bin Nusair, the governor of Islamic Africa, invaded Spain with about 7,000 Berber men, while Roderic was in the north fighting the Basques. The tale that Julian, Count of Ceuta, facilitated the invasion, because one of his daughters had been dishonored by Roderic, is possibly mythical. By late July, a battle took place at the Guadalete River in the province of Cádiz. Roderic was betrayed by his troops, who sided with his enemies, and the king was killed in battle. The Muslims then took much of southern Spain with little resistance, and went on to capture Toledo, where they executed several Visigothic nobles. In 712, Musa, the governor of Ifriqiya, arrived with another army of 18,000, with large Arab contingents. He took Mérida in 713 and invaded the north, taking Saragossa and León, which were still under King Ardo, in 714. After being recalled by the Caliph, Musa left his son Abd al-‘Aziz in command. By 716, most of the Iberian Peninsula was under Islamic rule, with Septimania taken between 721 and 725. The only effective resistance was in Asturias, where a Visigothic nobleman named Pelagius revolted in 718, and defeated the Muslims at the battle of Covadonga; this was the beginning of the Reconquest.

According to Joseph F. O'Callaghan, the remnants of the Hispano-Gothic aristocracy still played an important role in the society of Hispania. At the end of Visigothic rule, the assimilation of Hispano-Romans and Visigoths was occurring at a fast pace. Their nobility had begun to think of themselves as constituting one people, the gens Gothorum or the Hispani. An unknown number of them fled and took refuge in Asturias or Septimania. In Asturias they supported Pelagius's uprising, and joining with the indigenous leaders, formed a new aristocracy. The population of the mountain region consisted of native Astures, Galicians, Cantabri, Basques and other groups unassimilated into Hispano-Gothic society.

Resistance also continued in the regions around the Pyrenees with the establishment of the Marca Hispanica from 760 to 785. The Berbers settled in the south and the Meseta Central in Castile. Initially, the Muslims generally left the Christians alone to practise their religion, although non-Muslims were subject to Islamic law and treated as second-class citizens.

Settlements
Visigothic settlements were concentrated along the Garonne River between Bordeaux and Toulouse in Aquitaine during the 5th century, according to contemporary sources under the terms of the late Roman Empire as foederatii, or allies, and assigned billeting obligations to provide lodging for Roman soldiers, more or less as the imperial military had done in other provinces.

Later in the century, following annexations made by King Euric in Gaul and Hispania once the Roman Empire of the West had collapsed, specially after the Battle of Vouille, many Goths and their federated peoples, such as the Vandals, Ostrogoths and Sarmatians, moved to settle more freely under their kindred clans' rulers, the reiks, who received dukedom territories or comital offices as counts over smaller territories or key urban locations within the provinces of Hispania and in southwestern Gaul and its Mediterranean coast. Their settlements were made around the Roman cities of Emerita Augusta (Mérida), Barcino (Barcelona), Hispalis (Seville), Toletum (Toledo) and Septimanian Narbonne, which would be the main bases of Gothic power politically as well as militarily during the rest of the kingdom's history, as well as other settlements that were dispersed in rural farming areas between the upper reaches of the Douro, Ebro and Tagus rivers, in an area between Tierra de Campos, also known as Campi Gothorum, around Central Castile and León and Rioja, and Toledo to the east and south. After the fall of the Galician Kingdom of the Suebi, some further settlements were made along the Tagus river north of Lisbon, by Oporto and Astorga former strongholds of the Suebi. Little Visigothic settlement occurred elsewhere in the kingdom.

Founding of cities

The Visigoths founded the only new cities in Western Europe between the fifth and eighth centuries. It is certain (through contemporary Spanish accounts) that they founded four, and a possible fifth city is ascribed to them by a later Arabic source. All of these cities were founded for military purposes and three of them in celebration of victory.The first, Reccopolis, was founded by Liuvigild in 578 after his victory over the Franks, near what is today the tiny village of Zorita de los Canes. He named it after his son Reccared and built it with Byzantine imitations, containing a palace complex and mint, but it lay in ruins by the 9th century (after the Arab conquest).

At a slightly later date, Liuvigild founded a city he named Victoriacum after his victory over the Basques. Though it is often supposed to survive as the city of Vitoria, contemporary 12th-century sources refer to the latter city's foundation by Sancho VI of Navarre.

Liuvigild's son and namesake of the first Visigothic city founded his own sometime around 600. It is referred to by Isidore of Seville as Lugo id est Luceo in the Asturias, built after a victory over the Asturians or Cantabri.

The fourth and possibly final city of the Goths was Ologicus (perhaps Ologitis), founded using Basque labour in 621 by  Swinthila as a fortification against the recently subjected Basques. It is to be identified with modern Olite.

The possible fifth Visigothic foundation is Baiyara (perhaps modern Montoro), mentioned as founded by Reccared in the Geography of Kitab al-Rawd al-Mitar.

Culture and classical heritage

The Visigothic rule has often been attributed to be a part of the so-called Dark Ages, a time of cultural and scientific decay reversed only by Muslim Andalusia. Through the course of their existence the Visigoths supposedly remained "men of the woods never strayed too far from there," as Thomas F. Glick puts it.

 However, in fact, the Visigoths were preservers of the classical culture. The bathing culture of Andalusia, for example, often said to be a Muslim invention, is a direct continuation of Romano-Visigothic traditions. Visigothic Mérida housed baths supplied with water by aqueducts, and such aqueducts are also attested in Cordoba, Cadiz and Recopolis. Excavations confirm that Recopolis and Toledo, the Visigothic capital, were heavily influenced by the contemporary Byzantine architecture. When the Muslims looted Spain during their conquest they were amazed by the fine and innumerable Visigothic treasures. A few of these treasures were preserved as they were buried during the invasion – e.g., the votive crowns from the treasure of Guarrazar.

While only the senior monks were allowed to read books of non-Christian or heretic authors this did not prevent the rise of intellectuals such as, most prominently: Isidore of Seville, one of the most quoted scholars of the Middle Ages, known for the breadth of his literary output, highlighted by his Etymologies, an encyclopedia of the knowledge of the epoch that was known and translated throughout medieval Europe; Eugenius I of Toledo, an expert in  mathematics and astronomy; or Theodulf of Orléans, a theologian and poet who, after he had fled to the Frankish kingdom, participated in the Carolingian Renaissance. A Muslim source referred to Visigothic Seville as the "abode of the sciences". The Institutionum disciplinae from the mid seventh/early eight century confirms that Visigothic nobles were not only taught in reading and writing, but also in medicine, law and philosophy. An example of a highly educated nobleman was king Sisebut, who was a patron of learning and writer of poems, one of them about astronomy.

List of kings

Terving kings
These kings and leaders – with the exception of Fritigern and possibly Alavivus – were pagans.
Ariaric
Aoric
Athanaric (369–381)
Rothesteus, sub-king
Winguric, sub-king
Alavivus (c. 376), rebel against Valens
Fritigern (c. 376–c. 380), rebel against Athanaric and Valens

Balti dynasty
These kings were Arians (followers of the theological teaching of Arius). They tended to succeed their fathers or close relatives on the throne and thus constitute a dynasty, the Balti.
Alaric I (395–410)
Athaulf (410–415)
Sigeric (415)
Wallia (415–418)
Theodoric I (418–451)
Thorismund (451–453)
Theodoric II (453–466)
Euric (466–484)
Alaric II (484–507)
Gesalec (507–511)
Theodoric the Great (511–526), regent
Amalaric (511–531)

Post-Balti kings
The Visigothic monarchy took on a completely elective character with the fall of the Balti, but the monarchy remained Arian until Reccared I converted in 587 (Hermenegild had also converted earlier). Only a few sons succeeded their fathers to the throne in this period.

Theudis (531–548)
Theudigisel (548–549)
Agila I (549–554)
Athanagild (554–568)
Liuva I (568–572), only ruled in Narbonensis from 569
Liuvigild (569–586), ruled only south of the Pyrenees until 572
Hermenegild (580–585), sub-king in Baetica
Reccared I (580–601), son, sub-king in Narbonensis until 586, first Catholic king
Segga (586–587), rebel
Argimund (589–590), rebel
Liuva II (601–603), son
Witteric (603–610)
Gundemar (610–612)
Sisebut (612–621)
Reccared II (621), son
 Swinthila (621–631)
Reccimer (626–631), son and associate 
Sisenand (631–636)
Iudila  (632–633), rebel

Chintila (636–640)
Tulga (640–641)
 Chindaswinth (641–653)
Recceswinth (649–672), son, initially co-king
Froia  (653), rebel
Wamba (672–680)
Hilderic (672), rebel
Paul (672–673), rebel
Erwig (680–687)
Egica (687–702)
Suniefred  (693), rebel
Wittiza (694–710), son, initially co-king or sub-king in Gallaecia
Roderic (710–711), only in Lusitania and Carthaginiensis
Agila II (711–714), only in Tarraconensis and Narbonensis
Oppas (712), perhaps in opposition to Roderic and Agila II
Ardo (714–721), only in Narbonensis

Family tree

See also
Spanish surnames of Goth origin
Romano-Germanic culture
For evidence of Visigothic taxation, see De fisco Barcinonensi
Councils of Toledo
Germanic peoples
Arianism
Protofeudalism

Notes

Sources

Bachrach, Bernard S. "A Reassessment of Visigothic Jewish Policy, 589–711." American Historical Review 78, no. 1 (1973): 11–34.
Collins, Roger. The Arab Conquest of Spain, 710–797. Oxford: Blackwell Publishers, 1989. Reprinted 1998.
Collins, Roger. Law, Culture, and Regionalism in Early Medieval Spain. Great Yarmouth: Variorum, 1992. .
Collins, Roger. Visigothic Spain, 409–711. Oxford: Blackwell Publishing, 2004. .
 

Heather, Peter. The Goths. Oxford: Blackwell Publishers, 1996.
James, Edward, ed. Visigothic Spain: New Approaches. Oxford: Oxford University Press, 1980. .

 
Lacarra, José María. Estudios de alta edad media española. Valencia: 1975.
1475
Martínez Jiménez, Javier; Isaac Sastre de Diego; Carlos Tejerizo García. (2018) The Iberian Peninsula between 300 and 850. An Archaeological Perspective. Late Antique and Early Medieval Iberia 6. Amsterdam: Amsterdam University Press. 
Sivan, Hagith. "On Foederati, Hospitalitas, and the Settlement of the Goths in A.D. 418." American Journal of Philology 108, no. 4 (1987): 759–772.
 
Thompson, E. A. "The Barbarian Kingdoms in Gaul and Spain", Nottingham Mediaeval Studies, 7 (1963:4n11).
Thompson, E. A. The Goths in Spain. Oxford: Clarendon Press, 1969.

Wallace-Hadrill, John Michael. The Barbarian West, 400–1000. 3rd ed. London: Hutchison, 1967.

 
States and territories established in the 410s
States and territories disestablished in the 8th century
Former countries on the Iberian Peninsula
Former monarchies of Europe
Medieval France
Medieval Portugal
Medieval Spain
History of Portugal by polity
418 establishments
5th-century establishments in sub-Roman Gaul
721 disestablishments
8th-century disestablishments in Portugal
8th-century disestablishments in Spain
Barbarian kingdoms
Former kingdoms